Student News Network (SNN) is an Iranian official news agency known for publishing university and student news. All of SNN's content is free content and Creative Commons licensed.

History 
Student News Agency was founded on 2002 by Hadi Ghasemi. Ghasemi is the current CEO of SNN. SNN's name in early years of its activity was "Student News Network"; after receiving its official news agency license from Ministry of Culture and Islamic Guidance, it was renamed to "Student News Agency".

Services 
Besides university and students news, SNN also produces and publishes content related to a variety of subjects, including:
Science and Technology
 Provinces
 Politics
 Economics
 Culture
 Social
 Sports
 Photo
 Multimedia
 Graphic and Caricature

Controversial works 
Student News Agency has been one of the most active and marginalized media in the field of news and has caused controversial events in each of the governments of the Islamic Republic of Iran.

Doctor Salam 
The most marginal product of SNN is the political satire series "Doctor Salam", which deals with the current affairs of the society, criticizes the actions of government officials and has always been criticized by them. Every year, the anniversary of the launch of this product is held by Student News Agency, and thousands of enthusiasts and fans of this comic collection participate in places such as the 7th of Tir Martyrs' Stadium and other places.

The celebration has always been accompanied by various fringes. Among them is Dr. Salam's five-year birthday party, which was scheduled to take place at Azadi Indoor Stadium. However, with several sabotages by the officials of the Ministry of Ershad, the license to hold the program at Azadi Stadium was revoked and it was held at the Imam Ali Stadium of the Islamic Azad University.

So far, more than 180 episodes of this collection of socio-political satire have been produced and presented through the Student News Agency website.

Press Exhibition 
Every year, Student News Agency participates in press and news agency exhibitions, and its presence in this exhibition has always been accompanied by various news and margins.

For example, the presence of this news agency in the 2015 Press Exhibition was accompanied by various controversies. In this exhibition, the booth of Student News Agency had become one of the most newsworthy topics. To protest the policies of the exhibition, the agency's officials closed the exhibition by pulling purple ribbons around the booth and refusing to attend the exhibition.

Key people 

 CEO: Hadi Ghasemi
 Editor-in-Chief: Mohammad Amin Salimi

See also 

List of Iranian news agencies
Media of Iran

References

External links
 Student News Agency - Official website
 SNN page on Instgram
 SNN page on Twitter
 SNN channel on Telegram

Creative Commons-licensed websites
Iranian news websites
Mass media in Iran
News agencies based in Iran